Chitty Bang Bang was an airship built for the 1968 film Chitty Chitty Bang Bang. It was intended to represent the airship of Baron Bomburst of Vulgaria. Although fictional in inspiration, it was a fully functional flying airship.

Appearance 
Vulgaria, and the airship, is drawn from Roald Dahl's screenplay for the film, rather than Ian Fleming's original book.

The semi-rigid airship, whose appearance was designed by Ken Adam, was an approximate replica of a 1904 Lebaudy airship. The envelope was symmetrical fore-and-aft and short and deep compared to typical rigid airships, with pointed ends above the centre of the envelope that gave it the distinctive Lebaudy "hooked" appearance. The gondola was a long open truss structure beneath this and a crew basket beneath, with the typical Lebaudy feature  of cruciform control surfaces at the rear of the gondola.

The ends of the airship envelope were coloured with bands of the Vulgarian tricolor: black and purple on white. The flanks were adorned with a large black griffin, the arms of Vulgaria.

Actual airship 
The airship was built in 1967 by Malcolm Brighton. It was only the second British airship to be built post-war, the first being the Airship Club's 1951 Bournemouth. It was also the first British airship to be mainly filled with helium rather than hydrogen, though it was topped up with hydrogen.

A single Volkswagen Beetle engine of 40 hp drove two two-bladed propellers. The small Lebaudy control surfaces made the airship difficult to control in pitch.

On one flight by Malcolm Brighton and Derek Piggott the airship collided with two sets of high-voltage power wires, causing much damage. Soon after it was repaired, a freak storm tore the point of attachment of the mooring ropes, destroying it totally.

See also 
 Hyperion, another fictional Lebaudy-styled airship from the 1974 Walt Disney film, The Island at the Top of the World

References

External links 
 

Airship
Airships of the United Kingdom
Fictional airships
Accidents and incidents involving balloons and airships
1967 in the United Kingdom
Aircraft first flown in 1967
1960s British special-purpose aircraft